Richard Garvie (born June 7, 1984) is a British born Entrepreneur and stock car racing driver. He competes part-time in the ARCA Menards Series, driving for multiple different teams and car numbers.

ARCA Menards Series 
Fast Track Racing announced that Garvie was to make his ARCA debut at Memphis with Andy Hillenburg, but failed to start due to a problem with the engine after practice. A few weeks later he went on to make his ARCA East debut at Five Flags Speedway.
He ran the first three races of the 2021 ARCA Menards Series for Fast Track Racing in the No. 11, where he finished 17th at Daytona, 19th at Phoenix and 25th at Talladega and also participated in the first two East Series races of 2021 at New Smyrna and Five Flags Speedway. He didn't return to ARCA competition until Bristol in September of 2021, where he would finish 23rd, driving the No. 01.
Garvie returned to Fast Track Racing in 2022 at Talladega driving the No. 10 car in a partnership with pharmaceutical company Rugiet.

Personal life 
Garvie is from Corby in Northamptonshire. While living in the UK, Garvie worked as a TV anchor on motorsport programs for Premier Sports and as a radio personality on various stations around England and Scotland. Garvie was also responsible for keeping NASCAR on television in the UK after Sky Sports ended coverage following the 2010 Daytona 500.  In 2011, Garvie again brokered the deal to keep NASCAR on television in the UK & Ireland by taking the coverage to Premier Sports TV with sponsorship from 3M who at the time were a sponsor of Greg Biffle. 

In 2015, Garvie was running for election to the UK Parliament but was suspended by the Labour Party a week before the election after a dispute over how he paid for around £740 worth of train tickets using a bank account that appeared to have insufficient funds led to him appearing in court. The charge filed was fraud by misrepresentation and initially Garvie was sentence to around sixty hours of community service and to pay any monies owed to the railway company if they could prove that they were owed any money. Garvie successfully appealed the case later in 2015 because evidence in the initial hearing confirmed that he had used his real name, photo ID and bank card in his own name to purchase tickets which in effect contradicted the charge made against him as there was no element of misrepresentation. Lloyd's Bank had also written to the court in the original hearing stating that the company had no concerns about how Garvie had used his account, which was also highlighted in the appeal. Various legal blogs in the UK have covered this case including the appeal and questioned why the initial case even made it to court given that Garvie had inherently done nothing wrong. 

Garvie moved to the US in 2014 and lives in Minneola, FL  and until 2022 operated various event, festival and media companies in the United States.

Motorsports career results

ARCA Menards Series
(key) (Bold – Pole position awarded by qualifying time. Italics – Pole position earned by points standings or practice time. * – Most laps led.)

ARCA Menards Series East

References

External links 
 
 ARCA bio
 

1984 births
Living people
ARCA Menards Series drivers
NASCAR drivers
Racing drivers from Florida